Sphingomonas echinoides is a Gram-negative soil bacterium.

External links 
 usage of this bacteria
Type strain of Sphingomonas echinoides at BacDive -  the Bacterial Diversity Metadatabase

echinoides
Bacteria described in 1990